The Pawns of Null-A is a 1956 science fiction novel by American-Canadian writer A. E. van Vogt, originally published as a four-part serial in Astounding Stories from October 1948 to January 1949 as The Players of Null-A. It incorporates concepts from the General semantics of Alfred Korzybski and refers to non-Aristotelian logic. It was published in the UK with the original name and in later US republication also had the original name restored.

The novel is a continuation of the story of Gilbert Gosseyn from The World of Null-A, expanding on the galactic events which drove the interplanetary invasion of the earlier story.

External links 
 
 The Pawns of Null-A as serialized in Astounding, parts one, two, three, and four on the Internet Archive

1949 Canadian novels
1949 science fiction novels
General semantics
Novels by A. E. van Vogt
Sequel novels
Works originally published in Analog Science Fiction and Fact
Novels first published in serial form
Ace Books books